Chuathbaluk Airport  is a state-owned public-use airport located one nautical mile (1.85 km) northeast of the central business district of Chuathbaluk, a city in the Bethel Census Area of the U.S. state of Alaska.

Facilities 
It has one runway designated 9/27 with a gravel surface measuring 3,401 by 60 feet (1,037 x 18 m).

Airlines and destinations

Prior to its bankruptcy and cessation of all operations, Ravn Alaska served the airport from multiple locations.

Statistics

References

External links 
 FAA Alaska airport diagram (JPEG)

Airports in the Bethel Census Area, Alaska